Cedarbrae is a residential neighbourhood in the southwest quadrant of Calgary, Alberta. It is bounded by Southland Drive to the north, 24 Street W to the east, Anderson Road to the south and Tsuut'ina Trail to the west.

The lands were annexed by the city in 1956, and Cedarbrae was established in 1973. It is represented in the Calgary City Council by the Ward 11 councillor.

Demographics

Residents in this community had a median household income of $62,063 in 2000, and there were 11.8% low income residents living in the neighbourhood. As of 2000, 21.4% of the residents were immigrants. A proportion of 10.5% of the buildings were condominiums or apartments, and 22.7% of the housing was used for renting.

Education
The community is served by Cedarbrae Elementary public school and St. Cyril Elementary & Junior High (Catholic).

See also
List of neighbourhoods in Calgary

References

External links
Cedarbrae Community Association

Neighbourhoods in Calgary